Styx Glacier is a tributary glacier in the Southern Cross Mountains, flowing southeast to enter Campbell Glacier between Wood Ridge and Pinckard Table, in Victoria Land. Observed by the Northern Party of the New Zealand Geological Survey Antarctic Expedition (NZGSAE), 1965–66, which named it after the mythical river Styx.

Glaciers of Victoria Land
Borchgrevink Coast